Alfredo Zaiat (born 19 November 1964) is an Argentine economist and journalist.

Life
He has been working on the daily newspaper Página/12 since late eighties, where he is chief editor of Economics and Cash sections.
He is also columnist of the television program Con sentido público ("With public sense"), and radio host of the program Cheque en blanco ("Blank Check").
Moreover, for a two-year period (from 2007 to 2009) he coordinated the program "Iniciativa para la transparencia financiera" ("Initiative for financial transparency") led by Roberto Frenkel and Mario Damill. Furthermore, he performed as content advisor for the presentation of the gallery Economía y política. 200 años de historia ("Economics and politics. Two hundred years of history"), of the Casa Nacional del Bicentenario ("National Home of the Bicentennial").
In the academic environment, Zaiat is part of Programa Premio Amartya Sen ("Program Award Amartya Sen") of the School of Economic Sciences of the University of Buenos Aires, project led by Bernardo Kliksberg.

Bibliography
At the moment, the journalist has published two books and collaborated with a major publication of Página/12.
 ZAIAT, Alfredo. Economía a contramano. Cómo entender la economía política, Planeta, 2012
 ZAIAT, Alfredo, et al. Historia de la economía argentina del siglo XX, La Página, 2008
 ZAIAT, Alfredo. Economistas o astrólogos, Educa, 2004

References

1964 births
Living people
Argentine economists
Argentine journalists
Male journalists
People from Buenos Aires
University of Buenos Aires alumni